Woman in the Garden (French: Femme au jardin) (or Jeanne-Marguerite Lecadre in the Garden) is a painting begun in 1866 by Claude Monet when he was a young man of 26. The work was executed en plein air in oil on canvas with a relatively large size of 82 by 101 cm. and currently belongs in the collection of the Hermitage Museum in St Petersburg, Russia.

The woman in the painting is Jeanne-Marguerite Lecadre, the young wife of his well-to-do cousin Paul-Eugene Lecadre. The Lecadres lived at Le Havre and had a country house, Le Coteau, in nearby Sainte-Adresse, in the garden of which the painting was made during a short visit. X-ray analysis has revealed that it was actually painted over a previous picture.

The style of the painting is quite composed and detailed, unlike the typically impressionist works for which Monet was later acclaimed. Three principal objects, Jeanne-Marguerite, the central flowering rose bush in the bed of bright red flowers and the flowering bush on the right provide an ordered structure and Jeanne-Marguerite's bright white dress contrasts vividly with the reds, pinks and greens of the garden plants and trees. The subject matter foreshadowed Monet's lifelong passion for painting flowers and gardens in a natural setting.

See also
List of paintings by Claude Monet
100 Great Paintings, 1980 BBC series

References

Paintings by Claude Monet
1866 paintings
Paintings in the collection of the Hermitage Museum